The 2022 ABA League Second Division Playoffs is the basketball play-off tournament that decides the winner of the 2021–22 ABA League Second Division season. The winner of the play-offs qualifies for the 2022–23 ABA League First Division.

Qualified teams 
Source

Venue
In April 2021, it was announced that the Playoffs will be played in Skopje, North Macedonia.

Bracket
Knock-out elimination phases were played under single-game format.

Quarterfinals 
Quarterfinals were played on 13 April 2022.

Semifinals 
Semifinals were played on 15 April 2022.

Final

See also 
 2022 ABA League First Division Playoffs

 2020–21 domestic competitions
  2021–22 Basketball Championship of Bosnia and Herzegovina
  2021–22 Prva A liga
  2021–22 Macedonian First League
  2021–22 Basketball League of Serbia
  2021–22 Slovenian Basketball League

References

External links 
 Official website
 ABA League at Eurobasket.com

ABA Second Division seasons
Adriatic
2021–22 in European basketball leagues
2021–22 in Bosnia and Herzegovina basketball
2021–22 in Montenegrin basketball
2021–22 in Serbian basketball
2021–22 in Slovenian basketball
2021–22 in North Macedonia basketball
International basketball competitions hosted by North Macedonia